Calopadia cinereopruinosa is a species of lichen in the family Pilocarpaceae. Found in the Galápagos Islands, it was described as new to science in 2011.

References

Pilocarpaceae
Lichen species
Lichens described in 2011
Lichens of the Galápagos Islands
Taxa named by Robert Lücking